Jožef Smej (15 February 1922 – 21 November 2020) was a Slovene prelate of the Roman Catholic Church.
  
Smej was born in Bogojina, Slovenia and was ordained a priest on 8 December 1944. Smej was appointed auxiliary bishop of the Archdiocese of Maribor, as well as titular bishop of Tzernicus, on 15 April 1983 and ordained bishop on 23 May 1983. Smej held the position of auxiliary bishop of the Maribor diocese until his retirement on 18 June 2009. He died in November 2020 at the age of 98,
as auxiliary bishop emeritus of Maribor.

See also
Archdiocese of Maribor

References

External links
Catholic-Hierarchy
Maribor Archdiocese

1922 births
2020 deaths
Roman Catholic bishops in Yugoslavia
21st-century Roman Catholic bishops in Slovenia
People from the Municipality of Moravske Toplice
20th-century Roman Catholic titular bishops
Deaths from the COVID-19 pandemic in Slovakia